I Will is a 1919 British silent comedy film directed by Kenelm Foss and Hubert Herrick and starring Guy Newall, Ivy Duke and Dorothy Minto. In order to be able to marry a beautiful daughter of a socialist, a wealthy young aristocrat gains a job as a farmworker.

Cast
 Guy Newall as Lord Eustace Dorsingham  
 Ivy Duke as Ida Sturge  
 Dorothy Minto as Mrs. Giles 
 Cyril Raymond as Harris Giles  
 Ronald Power as Bart Sturge  
 Will Corrie as Kiffin  
 Wallace Bosco as Sherlock Blake  
 Percy Crawford as Boosey  
 Lyell Johnstone as Professor Biggs  
 Philip Hewland as Landlord

References

Bibliography
 Low, Rachael. History of the British Film, 1918-1929. George Allen & Unwin, 1971.

External links

1919 films
1919 comedy films
British silent feature films
British comedy films
Films directed by Kenelm Foss
Films set in England
British black-and-white films
1910s English-language films
1910s British films
Silent comedy films